St Kilda Film Festival is Australia's longest running short film festival and has been showcasing Australian short films since 1983. The festival, produced and presented by the city of Port Phillip, screens Australian short films in all genres including drama, comedy, documentary, animation and digital media.

The short film competition awards over $50,000 in cash and craft awards, including a $10,000 prize for Best Short Film.

Past winners

References

Film festivals in Melbourne
Short film festivals in Australia